The Geographical Dictionary of the Kingdom of Poland and other Slavic Countries is a monumental Polish gazetteer, published 1880–1902 in Warsaw by Filip Sulimierski, Bronisław Chlebowski, Władysław Walewski and others.

External links 
 Słownik geograficzny Królestwa Polskiego
 Alphabetic index
 DjVu format with a search engine
 An index for a DjVu browser 

Gazetteers
Polish encyclopedias
Geographic history of Poland
History books about Poland
1880 books
19th-century encyclopedias
20th-century encyclopedias